A souvenir is an object a traveler brings home for the memories associated with it.

Souvenir(s) may also refer to:

Film, theatre, and television 
 Souvenir (1989 film), a British drama starring Christopher Plummer
 Souvenir, a 1996 film featuring Melvil Poupaud
 Souvenir, a 2006 film produced by Hanif Kureishi
 Souvenir (2016 film), a film directed by Bavo Defurne
 The Souvenir, a 2019 American-British drama film
 Souvenir (play), a 2005 play by Stephen Temperley
 "Souvenir" (Mad Men), an episode of the third season of the US television show Mad Men

Music

Classical music
 Souvenir, composition by František Drdla (1868–1944)
 Souvenir, composition by László Sáry (born 1940)
Souvenir, composition by John Cage
 Souvenir, composition by Frank Bridge (1879–1941)
 Souvenir, song by Édouard Lalo (1823–1892)
Souvenir (Magnus Lindberg), a 2010 musical composition by Magnus Lindberg

Bands
 Souvenir (Spanish band), a Spanish indie pop/electro-pop band
 Souvenirs (duo), Danish musical duo

Albums

Souvenir 
 Souvenir (Andy Sears album), 2011
 Souvenir (Eric Johnson album), 2002
 Souvenir (Kristy Thirsk album), 2003
 Souvenir (Sestre album)
 Souvenir (Banner Pilot album), 2014
 Souvenir (Miranda! album), 2021
 Souvenir (Pop Etc album)
 Souvenir: 1989—1998, a compilation by The Rankin Family
 Souvenir: The Ultimate Collection, a box set by Billy Joel
 Souvenir, an album by The Blakes
 Souvenir, an album by Ernesto Djédjé
 Souvenir, an album by Marlee Scott
 Souvenir: The Singles 2004–2012, a compilation by Kaiser Chiefs

Souvenirs 
 Souvenirs, a poem for orchestra (1906) by Vincent d'Indy
 Souvenirs (The Country Gentlemen album), 1995
 Souvenirs (Dan Fogelberg album)
 Souvenirs (Demis Roussos album), 1975
 Souvenirs (The Duke Spirit album)
 Souvenirs (The Gathering album), 2003
 Souvenirs (John Prine album), 2000
 Souvenirs (Tina Arena album)
 Souvenirs (Vince Gill album)
 Souvenirs, an album by Bettye LaVette
 Souvenirs, an album by Big Tom and The Mainliners
 Souvenirs, an album by Tosca
 Souvenirs, an album by White Heart

Songs 
 "Souvenir" (song), a 1981 song by Orchestral Manoeuvres in the Dark
 "Souvenir", a song by Matia Bazar (1985)
 "Souvenir", a song by Selena Gomez, from the deluxe edition of the album Rare
 "Souvenir", a song by Billy Joel, from the album Streetlife Serenade
 "Souvenir", a song by Avril Lavigne, from the album Head Above Water
 "Souvenir", a song by Paul McCartney, from the album Flaming Pie
 "Souvenir", a song by Boygenius, from the extended play Boygenius
 "Souvenirs" (song), a 1959 song by Barbara Evans
 "Souvenirs", a song by John Prine, from the album Diamonds in the Rough
 "Souvenirs", a song by the Vels, from the album House of Miracles
 "Souvenirs", a song by Voyage
 "Souvenirs", a song by Meat Loaf, from the album Braver Than We Are

Other 
 Souvenir (typeface), a font created in 1914